Jerry Critchlow (21 June 1904 – 29 September 1972) was a British painter. His work was part of the painting event in the art competition at the 1948 Summer Olympics.

References

1904 births
1972 deaths
20th-century British painters
British male painters
Olympic competitors in art competitions
People from Wolverhampton
20th-century British male artists